Dombano (Tomu) is a dialect cluster of Teluk Bintuni Regency in West Papua, Indonesia. In Teluk Bintuni Regency, it is spoken in Aranday, Kamundan, and Weriagar districts.

References

Nuclear South Bird's Head languages